The Chevrolet Celta, also known as the Suzuki Fun, is a low cost supermini car produced by Chevrolet for the Latin American market between 2000 and 2015. A sedan version is marketed as the Chevrolet Prisma. 600,000 Celtas have been built in Gravataí, more than one hundred thousand per year.

Evolution

2000–2006 

An "Off-Road" accessories kit was for sale for both old and new Celtas in 2005, and the 1.0 L was converted into a gasoline-ethanol flexible fuel engine (gasoline versions are still available, especially outside Brazil).

2006–2011 
In 2006, the Celta underwent a facelift, which provided for a more modern look and an enhancement of build quality. The new front fascia makes it closer to new Chevrolet models, especially the new Brazilian made Chevrolet Vectra based on the Opel Astra [H] (different from the Chevrolet Vectra C model sold in other latin countries as México or Chile).

2011–2015 
A second and final facelift was applied to the Celta in 2011.

Related models

Chevrolet Prisma 
A sedan version of the Celta, named Chevrolet Prisma, was released in early 2007. It was not meant to replace Classic (a low cost sedan version of the Corsa B) neither the Corsa Sedan (C), but to fill a market gap between them instead. The only available engine option is a 1.4 L Econo.Flex gasoline/ethanol flexible fuel engine. Its high compression rate gives as a result a maximum output of 97 PS when running on ethanol and 95 hp when running on gasoline.

Early 2009 marked the release of the Prisma 1.0-litre and the new VHC-E engine ( gasoline and  ethanol) for Prisma and Celta. By early 2012, 1.5 million Celtas had been built in Gravataí.

Suzuki Fun 
The Japanese automaker Suzuki sold a rebadge variant of the Celta called Suzuki Fun in Argentina between 2004 and 2011. Was only available in 3 and 5 doors configuration and LS / LT trim levels. The Fun was replaced by the facelifted Celta in July 2011 after the Suzuki brand was entirely withdrawal from that country.

Technical details
The 1.0 L gasoline engine has a high power to displacement ratio (51 kW/L, 70 PS/L or 1.1 hp/cu in). However, this power is only available at 6400 rpm, and the maximum torque is 8.6 kgf·m (88 N·m) at 3000 rpm. Today, the Celta is sold only with the 1.0 FlexPower (the 1.4 MPFI stopping production in 2007). In 2002 GM changed the 1.0 MPFI engine to a 1.0 VHC, in 2005 to VHC FlexPower (70 PS with Petrol or alcohol), and in 2009 to VHCE FlexPower (77 PS with Petrol and 78 PS with alcohol). The total weight is approximately 850 kg (1,872 lb). In Uruguay, Celta 1.4 MPFI are available since 2009 as the 'new' Celta with the new front lights and all facelift add-ons. This model continues on sell in 2012 and manufacturing dates of the units are from 2011 (1.4 MPFI engines didn't stop production in 2007).

Safety
The Chevrolet Celta in its most basic Latin American configuration  with no airbags has been rated as highly unsafe by Latin NCAP in 2011, scoring only one star for adult occupants and two stars for children. Important to mention that when Celta was developed (2000) there was no Latin NCAP protocol available and that all regulatory safety items were met for the countries were Celta was sold.

Replacement
In 2012, General Motors announced the second generation Chevrolet Prisma will be based on the sedan version of the brand new Chevrolet Onix.

In 2015, the Celta was discontinued to increase production capacity of the Gravataí plant, in favor of the Onix/Prisma models, which enjoy very good sales in Brazil.

With the Celta's end of production, the whole Onix line replaced it.

References

External links

Chevrolet Celta official site

Celta
Cars introduced in 2000
Cars discontinued in 2015
Cars of Brazil
Front-wheel-drive vehicles
Subcompact cars
2000s cars
2010s cars
Latin NCAP superminis